The Huddersfield Town Development Squad are the reserve team of Championship club Huddersfield Town. They play competitively as the Huddersfield Town Under 21s in the Professional Development League 2 Northern Division, of which they finished 1st in the 2013-14 season, but then proceeded to lose the nationwide play-off semi-final against Queens Park Rangers.

Huddersfield Town are represented at Under 18 level by the Huddersfield Town Academy. The Academy compete in the U18 Professional Development League 2 North Division, of which they finished 1st in the 2013-14 season, and subsequently won the nationwide play-off final against Crewe Alexandra, becoming champions of the 2013–14 U18 Professional Development League 2. They also reached the quarter finals of last season's FA Youth Cup, losing 2-1 at eventual runners-up Fulham.

Home games for both sides are played at the club's training ground, Canalside, with the exception of some Development Squad fixtures, and FA Youth Cup games, which are played at the first team's John Smith's Stadium.

Development squad
Huddersfield Town Football Club Under-21s, also known as the Huddersfield Town Development Squad, is the most senior level of Huddersfield Town’s youth development and the club's former reserve team. They play in League 2 North of the Professional Development League. The team is effectively Huddersfield Town’s second-string side, but is limited to three outfield players and one goalkeeper over the age of 21 per game following the introduction of new regulations from the 2012–13 season. They were four times Central League Champions as the Reserve Team but withdrew form formal reserve team competition 2009-10 season, and have been replaced by the Huddersfield Town Development Squad, playing a number of arranged friendlies during the season until 2012-13 season.

History

Reserve team years
The Huddersfield Town reserves competed in The Central League Division One East until the 2009–10 season when the Huddersfield Town manager Lee Clark chose not to enter a reserve team in the Central League during the 2010-11 season, instead planning a series of high quality friendlies. Clark stated that "the idea of reserve team football is to bridge the gap between youth team and first team football" and that "[we] have faced a lot of very young sides in the reserve league this season and that will not provide our own young professionals with the test they need".

Whilst playing at reserve league level, the reserves split their home games between A.F.C. Emley's Welfare Ground and the Galpharm Stadium.

First team coach Paul Stephenson was the last serving reserve team manager.

Development squad (2009–2012)

Lee Clark saw through his idea to discontinue the reserve team, and subsequently created the club's development squad, to be managed by development coach Steve Watson. Following a behind-closed-doors game at Doncaster Rovers, Watson described the team's games as "working very well", "from both perspectives – fitness for our first team squad members and as a way of integrating the younger players into a higher level of football."

When Lee Clark left as manager of the first team on 15 February 2012, his coaching staff (including Watson) also left the club. On 12 April 2012, the club appointed former Manchester City Elite Development Squad leader and Rochdale first team manager Steve Eyre as the club's Senior Professional Development Coach.

Most fixtures have so far been played at the club's training ground, Canalside, but occasionally the Galpharm Stadium has been used to host Development Squad games that are open to the public.

Professional Development League (2012–present)
From the 2012–13 season Huddersfield's development squad will compete in the newly formed Under 21 Professional Development League in the League 2 North Division,  the league was set up as part of the wide-reaching Elite Player Performance Plan, Town will be one of 12 clubs in the Category Two Northern section along with Crewe Alexandra, Barnsley, Birmingham City, Coventry City, Derby County, Leeds United, Leicester City, Nottingham Forest, Sheffield United, Sheffield Wednesday and Wigan Athletic. The fixtures are set up to mirror those in the FA Premier Academy League for Under 18s.

In the 2019–20 season, a Huddersfield team entered a small league (under-21 plus three overage) along with Brentford and four Scottish clubs.

Current squad

Out on loan

Honours
 The Central League Champions: 4
 1914-15, 1924–25, 1925–26, 1930–31
 U21 Professional Development League 2 North, 1st Place:
 2013–14

Academy

The role of the Huddersfield Town Academy is to develop players and their abilities to their full potential for the club's first team. The academy has produced a number of players, including former England under-21 players Andy Booth and Jon Stead, former Irish Under 21 internationals Michael Collins and James Berrett as well as Nathan Clarke, who made 300 appearances for the first team. The academy is currently managed by former Sheffield Wednesday and Sheffield United player Leigh Bromby.

History

Future 
After the arrival of current chairman Dean Hoyle in the summer of 2009, an overall development of every aspect of Huddersfield Town including the academy. The main development taking place with regards to the academy is the current redevelopment of the club's new training complex, Canalside. The  project will conclude with the academy players training alongside their first team counterparts for the first time at a high quality, purpose-built facility.

Current academy squad

 U18 Professional Development League 2 Champions:
 2013–14

Current academy staff

Recent academy graduates
Academy graduates who still play for Huddersfield, including those that are currently out on loan to other clubs, are highlighted in green.

Appearances and goals are those in competitive fixtures for Huddersfield Town. 

Information in the above table is correct as of 5 May 2022

References

Reserves And Academy
Yorkshire Combination
Football academies in the United Kingdom
Professional Development League
Football academies in England